Aycan Önel (born 17 April 1933) is a Turkish sprinter. She competed in the women's 100 metres at the 1960 Summer Olympics.

References

1933 births
Living people
Athletes (track and field) at the 1960 Summer Olympics
Turkish female sprinters
Turkish female long jumpers
Olympic athletes of Turkey
Place of birth missing (living people)